Macerator may refer to:
 Pumping station, solids maceration
 Maceration (sewage), machine that reduces solids to small pieces
 Chopper pumps, pump with cutting system to facilitate chopping/maceration of solids
 Sewage pumping, where maceration of solids is used
 Maceration (food), reduction of food into small pieces
 A character from the Transformers franchise